Julien Pradeyrol better known as Teki Latex (born 1978 in Paris, France) is a Paris-based electronica, dance and hip-hop artist, working both independently and as part of various formations, notably French hip-hop act TTC and in duo Sound Pellegrino Thermal Team with French producer Orgasmic. He runs the record label Sound Pellegrino. He currently runs a weekly DJ TV show called Overdrive Infinity that you can watch on Dailymotion.

Life
He is also the co-founder of the independent hip-hop and electronica record label Institubes.
He is of Italian descent. "Les matins de Paris", a single from his first solo album Party de plaisir, was recorded with Lio and peaked at number 14 in France.

Discography

Albums

Collaborations
2007:  33 Hz + Devin the Dude + Teki Latex): Paris, Texas (Remixes) (Dither Down)
2008: Orgasmic and Tekitek: The Sixpack Anthem (Maxi) (Institubes label)
2011: Sound Pellegrino Thermal Team: Bassface / Pretty Pretty Good EP (Remix) (Sound Pellegrino label)

Singles

References

External links
Teki Latex on Myspace

French male singers
French rappers
1978 births
Living people
French people of Italian descent
French hip hop record producers